Yacca may refer to:
 Trees of the species Podocarpus purdieanus and Podocarpus coriaceus, found in the West Indies
 Plants of the Xanthorrhoea genus, found in Australia

See also 
 Yucca, several plant species
 Yaca (disambiguation)
 Yacka (disambiguation)